Below is a list of chief commissioners of Coorg Province:

Notes 
a  The Acting Governors were appointed for a temporary period until the post of Governor was filled.

Sources
Rulers of Coorg

Coorg